The Leeds City Council elections were held on Thursday, 8 May 1986, with one third of the council and a vacancy in Halton to be elected, following the resignation by Conservative incumbent Martin Dodgson in March. Prior to that, there had been a defection by the former-Alliance councillor in Armley, Sandy Melville, to Independent in January and a sacking (from committees) and de-selection as Labour candidate for Wortley for Pat Fathers after he was found to be leaking information the previous December.

Although largely a re-run of the last election's wins (with an extra victory in Pudsey South) for Labour, these seats having been last fought in the 1982 election with a much stronger performance from the Conservatives resulted in a handful of gains for Labour. The Conservatives continued their decline, winning less than a quarter of the wards for the first time, with their wins mostly confined to the north of the city facing an increasingly competitive Alliance there. The Alliance, resurgent after much of their 1982 spike had looked to be ebbing away, were now close to usurping the Conservatives for second place in votes.

Labour captured the remaining Tory seats in Barwick & Kippax and Garforth & Swillington, and increased their representation in Morley North and Pudsey South with gains from the weakened Conservatives there. Labour also gained the sole Alliance seat in Richmond Hill, and came within 26 votes from gaining Armley from them. The Alliance however managed to offset their loss with a gain of their own in Moortown, ousting prominent Tory Sydney Symmonds.

Election result

This result has the following consequences for the total number of seats on the council after the elections:

Ward results

By-elections between 1986 and 1987

References

1986 English local elections
1986
1980s in Leeds